McIlhenny or McElhenny is an Irish surname commonly found in Donegal and Derry. They are a Sept of the Cenel Eogain race, son of Niall high king of Ireland. In Gaelic the name translates "servant of Saint Canice". Notable people with the surname include:

Bernice McIlhenny Wintersteen (1903–1986), American art collector, president of the Philadelphia Museum of Art (1964–1968)
Don McIlhenny (born 1934), American football player
Edmund McIlhenny (1815–1890), American businessman and inventor of Tabasco sauce
Edward Avery McIlhenny (1872–1949), American businessman and Arctic explorer
Henry Plumer McIlhenny (1919–1986), American art collector
John Avery McIlhenny (1867–1942), American businessman, Rough Rider, and politician
Paul C. P. McIlhenny (1944–2013), American businessman and conservationist
Walter Stauffer McIlhenny (1910–1985) American businessman and World War II Marine
Craig McIlhenny (1970-present) Scottish surgeon and mountaineer

McElhenny 
Hugh McElhenny (1928–2022), American football player
Rob McElhenny, (1977–present), American actor and writer best known for It's Always Sunny in Philadelphia

McElheny 
Josiah McElheny (born 1966), American artist
Victor McElheny (born 1935), American science writer

See also
McElhenney
McElhinney

Surnames of Irish origin
Anglicised Irish-language surnames